The Datar–Mathews Method (DM Method) is a method for real options valuation. The method provides an easy way to determine the real option value of a project simply by using the average of positive outcomes for the project. The method can be understood as an extension of the net present value (NPV) multi-scenario Monte Carlo model with an adjustment for risk aversion and economic decision-making. The method uses information that arises naturally in a standard discounted cash flow (DCF), or NPV, project financial valuation. It was created in 2000 by Vinay Datar, professor at Seattle University; and Scott H. Mathews, Technical Fellow at The Boeing Company.

Method 

The mathematical equation for the DM Method is shown below. The method captures the real option value by discounting the distribution of operating profits at R, the market risk rate, and discounting the distribution of the discretionary investment at r, risk-free rate, before the expected payoff is calculated. The option value is then the expected value of the maximum of the difference between the two discounted distributions or zero. Fig. 1.

 

  is a random variable representing the future benefits, or operating profits at time T. The present valuation of  uses R, a discount rate consistent with the risk level of   R is the required rate of return for participation in the target market, sometimes termed the hurdle rate.
  is a random variable representing the strike price. The present valuation of  uses r, the rate consistent with the risk of investment of  In many generalized option applications, the risk-free discount rate is used. However other discount rates can be considered, such as the corporate bond rate, particularly when the application is an internal corporate product development project.
  is the real option value for a single stage project. The option value can be understood as the expected value of the difference of two present value distributions with an economically rational threshold limiting losses on a risk-adjusted basis. This value may also be expressed as a stochastic distribution.

The differential discount rate for R and r implicitly allows the DM Method to account for the underlying risk. If R > r, then the option will be risk-averse, typical for both financial and real options. If R < r, then the option will be risk-seeking. If R = r, then this is termed a risk-neutral option, and has parallels with NPV-type analyses with decision-making, such as decision trees. The DM Method gives the same results as the Black–Scholes and the binomial lattice option models, provided the same inputs and the discount methods are used. This non-traded real option value therefore is dependent on the risk perception of the evaluator toward a market asset relative to a privately held investment asset.

The DM Method is advantageous for use in real option applications because unlike some other option models it does not require a value for sigma (a measure of uncertainty) or for S0 (the value of the project today), both of which are difficult to derive for new product development projects; see further under real options valuation. Finally, the DM Method uses real-world values of any distribution type, avoiding the requirement for conversion to risk-neutral values and the restriction of a lognormal distribution; see further under Monte Carlo methods for option pricing.

Extensions of the method for other real option valuations have been developed such as contract guarantee (put option), Multi-Stage (compound option), Early Launch (American option), and others.

Implementation 

The DM Method may be implemented using Monte-Carlo simulation, or in a simplified algebraic or other form (see the Range Option below).

Using simulation, for each sample, the engine draws a random variable from both  calculates their present values, and takes the difference. Fig. 2A. The difference value is compared to zero, the maximum of the two is determined, and the resulting value recorded by the simulation engine. Here, reflecting the optionality inherent in the project, a forecast of a net negative value outcome corresponds to an abandoned project, and has a zero value. Fig. 2B. The resulting values create a payoff distribution representing the economically rational set of plausible, discounted value forecasts of the project at time T0.

When sufficient payoff values have been recorded, typically a few hundred, then the mean, or expected value, of the payoff distribution is calculated. Fig. 2C. The option value is the expected value, the first moment of all positive NPVs and zeros, of the payoff distribution.

A simple interpretation is:

 

where operating profit and launch costs are the appropriately discounted range of cash flows to time T0.

The option value can also be understood as a distribution reflecting the uncertainty of the underlying variables.

DM Option Variations

Algebraic lognormal form 

The DM real option can be considered a generalized form for option valuation. Its simulation produces a truncated present value distribution of which the mean value is interpreted to be the option value. With certain boundary conditions, the DM option can be reformulated algebraically as a conditional expectation of a lognormal distribution similar to the form and characteristics of a typical financial option, such as the European, single stage Black-Scholes financial option. This section illustrates the transformation of the DM real option to its algebraic lognormal form and its relationship to the Black-Scholes financial option formula. The process illuminates some of the more technical elements of the option formulation thereby providing further insight to the underlying concepts.

The lognormal form of the DM Method remains a simple concept based on the same computation procedures as the simulation form. It is the conditional expectation of the discounted projected future value outcome distribution, less a predetermined purchase cost (strike price or launch cost), (modeled in this example as a scalar value) multiplied by the probability of that truncated distribution greater than a threshold—nominally 0. A conditional expectation is the expected value of the truncated distribution (mean of the tail), MT, computed with respect to its conditional probability distribution (Fig. 3).

The option calculation procedure values the project investment (option purchase), C0, at T0. This relative shift sets up the conditional expectation of the truncated distribution at T0.

In a lognormal distribution for a project future value outcome, both the mean, and standard deviation, must be specified. The standard deviation, of the distribution  is proportionately discounted along with the distribution,  

The conditional expectation of the discounted value outcome is the mean of the tail MT:
 is the cumulative distribution function of the standard normal distribution (N(0,1)).
The probability of the project being in the money and launched (“exercised”) is 

The project investment (option) value is:

The involved lognormal mathematics can be burdensome and opaque for some business practices within a corporation. However, several simplifications can ease that burden and provide clarity without sacrificing the soundness of the option calculation. One simplification is the employment of the standard normal distribution, also known as the Z-distribution, which has a mean of 0 and a standard deviation of 1. It is common practice to convert a normal distribution to a standard normal and then use the standard normal table to find the value of probabilities.

Define as the standard normal variable: 

The conditional expectation of the discounted value outcome is:  

Then probability of the project being in the money and launched (“exercised”) is: 

The Datar-Mathews lognormal option value simplifies to:

Transformation to the Black–Scholes Option 

The Black–Scholes option formula (as well as the binomial lattice) is a special case of the simulated DM real option. With subtle, but notable differences, the logarithmic form of the DM Option can be algebraically transformed into The Black-Scholes option formula. The real option valuation is based on an approximation of the future value outcome distribution, which may be lognormal, at time TT projected (discounted) to T0. In contrast, the Black-Scholes is based on a lognormal distribution projected from historical asset returns to present time T0. Analysis of these historical trends results in a calculation termed the volatility (finance) factor.

The following lognormal distribution with a standard deviation  is replaced by the volatility factor .

The Black-Scholes option value simplifies to its familiar form:

The terms N(d1) and N(d2) are applied in the calculation of the Black–Scholes formula, and are expressions related to operations on lognormal distributions; see section "Interpretation" under Black–Scholes. Referring to Fig. 5 and using the lognormal form of the DM Option, it is possible to derive certain insights to the internal operation of an option:

N(-Z) or N(d2) is a measure of the area of the tail of the distribution, MT (delineated by X0), relative to that of the entire distribution, e.g. the probability of tail of the distribution, at time T0. Fig. 5, Right. The true probability of expiring in-the-money in the real (“physical”) world is calculated at time T0, the launch or strike date, measured by area of the tail of the distribution. N(σ-Z) or N(d1) is the value of the option payoff relative to that of the asset.   where MT is the mean of the tail at time T0.

Data patterns  

Businesses that collect historical data may be able to leverage the similarity of assumptions across related projects facilitating the calculation of option values. One resulting simplification is the Uncertainty Ratio, which can often be modeled as a constant for similar projects. UR is the degree of certainty by which the projected future cash flows can be estimated. UR is invariant of time  with values typically between 0.35 and 1.0 for many multi-year business projects.

Applying this observation as a constant, K, to the above formulas results in a simpler formulation:

 is normally distributed and the values can be accessed in a table of standard normal variables. The resulting real option value can be derived simply on a hand-held calculator once K is determined:

Then  (Fig. 6)  A real option valuation is typically applied when the probability of exercise is approximately less than 50%   Businesses need apply their own data across similar projects to establish relevant parameter values.

Triangular form (Range Option)
 
Given the difficulty in estimating the lognormal distribution mean and standard deviation of future returns, other distributions instead are more often applied for real options used in business decision making. The sampled distributions may take any form, although the triangular distribution is often used, as is typical for low data situations, followed by a uniform distribution (continuous) or a beta distribution. This approach is useful for early-stage estimates of project option value when there has not been sufficient time or resources to gather the necessary quantitative information required for a complete cash flow simulation, or in a portfolio of projects when simulation of all the projects is too computationally demanding. Regardless of the distribution chosen, the procedure remains the same for a real option valuation. 

For a triangular distribution, sometimes referred to as three-point estimation, the mode value corresponds to the “most-likely” scenario, and the other two other scenarios, “pessimistic” and “optimistic”, represent plausible deviations from the most-likely scenario (often modeled as approximating a two-sided 1-out-of-10 likelihood or 90% confidence). This range of estimates results in the eponymous name for the option, the DM Range Option. The DM Range Option method is similar to the fuzzy method for real options. The following example (Fig. 7) uses a range of future estimated operating profits of a (pessimistic), b (optimistic) and m (mode or most-likely).

For  discount a, b and m by 

The classic DM Method presumes that the strike price is represented by a random variable (distribution ) with the option solution derived by simulation. Alternatively, without the burden of performing a simulation, applying the average or mean scalar value of the launch cost distribution  (strike price) results in a conservative estimate of DM Range Option value. If the launch cost is predetermined as a scalar value, then the DM Range Option value calculation is exact.

The expected value of the truncated triangular distribution (mean of the right tail), is 

The probability of the project being in the money and launched is the proportional area of the truncated distribution relative to the complete triangular distribution. This partial expectation is computed by the cumulative distribution function (CDF) given the probability distribution will be found at a value greater than or equal to X for a right tail:

The DM Range Option value, or project investment, is:

Use of a DM Range Option facilitates the application of real option valuation to future project investments. The DM Range Option provides an estimate of valuation that differs marginally with that of the DM Option algebraic lognormal distribution form. However, the projected future value outcome, S, of a project is rarely based on a lognormal distribution derived from historical asset returns, as is a financial option. Rather, the future value outcome, S, (as well as the strike price, X, and the standard deviation, SD), is more than likely a three-point estimation based on engineering and marketing parameters. Therefore, the ease of application of the DM Range Option is often justified by its expediency and is sufficient to estimate the conditional value of a future project.

Demand Curve Integration 

Many early-stage projects find that the dominant unknown values are the first-order range estimates of the major components of operating profits: revenue and manufacturing cost of goods sold (COGS). In turn the uncertainty about revenue is driven by guesstimates of either market demand price or size. Market price and size can be estimated independently, though coupling them together in a market demand relationship is a better approach. COGS, the total of cost of product quantity to be sold, is the final component and trends according to an experience or learning curve cost relationship linked to market size. The interplay of these three market elements within a DM Real Options simulation, even with early-stage ranges, can reduce uncertainty for project planning by yielding reasonably narrowed target estimates for product pricing and production size that maximizes potential operating profits and improves option value.

A market price demand curve graphs the relationship of price to size, or quantity demanded. The law of demand states there is an inverse relationship between price and quantity demanded, or simply as the price decreases product quantity demanded will increase. A second curve, the manufacturing cost graph, models the learning curve effect illustrating the relationship between the quantity of goods produced and the efficiency gains of that production. Fig. 9. Mathematically, the learning curve takes the form of a power function.

A demand curve can be realistically modeled using an inverse lognormal distribution which convolves the market price distribution estimate with the market size range. A demand curve deftly models highly differentiated markets which through pricing distinguish selective product or service characteristics such as quality or grade, functional features, and availability, along with quantity sold. Examples are automobiles, shoes, smart phones, and computers. Airfare markets are highly differentiated where demand pricing and quantity sold are dependent on seasonality, day of week, time of day, routing, sale promotions, and seating or fare class. The airfare demand distribution pattern is well represented with an inverse lognormal distribution as shown in Fig. 10.

Curves for all the above components, market price, size, and COGS, can be simulated with variability to yield an optimal operating profit input for the real option calculation (Fig. 11). For example, the simulation results represented in Fig. 12. indicate ranges for price and unit quantity that potentially will maximize profitability. Extracted from these first-order range estimates, a selection of the peak (frequency) values identifies a significantly narrowed spread of promising estimates. Knowing these optimal value spreads substantially reduces uncertainty and provides a better, more targeted set of parameters from which to confidently base innovation development plans and option value.

Comparison to other methods 
The fuzzy pay-off method for real option valuation, created in 2009, provides another accessible approach to real option valuation. Though each use differing mathematical methods (Fuzzy: fuzzy logic; DM: numerical simulation and geometry) the underlying principal is strikingly similar: the likelihood of a positive payoff. Separately examining the two factors (possibility/probability, and positive payoff) demonstrates this similarity. 

A simple interpretation is the proportionality ratio of the positive area of the fuzzy NPV over the total area of the fuzzy NPV. The probability of the project payoff for the DM Range Option is proportional to  the area (CDF) of the positive distribution relative to the complete distribution. This is computed as  In each the ratios of the areas compute to the same possibility/probability value. Likewise, the positive payoff for the DM Range Option is the mean of the right tail (MT), or  less the strike price  This insight to the mechanics of the two methods illustrates not only their similarity but also their equivalency.

In a 2016 article in the Advances in Decision Sciences journal, researchers from the Lappeenranta University of Technology School of Business and Management compared the DM Method to the fuzzy pay-off method for real option valuation and noted that while the valuation results were similar, the fuzzy pay-off one was more robust in some conditions. In some comparative cases, the Datar-Mathews Method has a significant advantage in that it is easier to operate and connects NPV valuation and scenario analysis with Monte Carlo simulation (or geometry) technique thus greatly improving intuition in the usage of real options methods in managerial decision and explanation to third parties. Through its simulation interface, the Datar-Mathews Method easily accommodates multiple and sometimes correlated cash flow scenarios, including dynamic programming, typical of complex projects, such as aerospace, that are difficult to model using fuzzy sets.

DM Method and Prospect Theory 

Real options are about objectively valuing innovation opportunities. Vexingly, these opportunities, evanescent and seemingly risky, are often comprehended subjectively. However, both the objective valuation mechanism and the subjective interpretation of results are often misunderstood leading to investment reluctance and potentially undervaluing opportunities.

The DM real option employs the objective valuation formula  where  is the default threshold when it is economically rational to terminate (abandon) an opportunity event. If a simulation event (‘draw’) calculates a negative outcome (i.e.,  operating profits less than launch costs), then that event outcome should be rationally cut, or terminated, recording a  residual. Only net positive economic outcomes  are tallied. This operation leaves the misperception of ‘the odds being stacked’ favoring only positive outcomes seemingly resulting in an abnormally high valuation.
 
The actual DM formula is  where the threshold  (‘floor’) can assume any value (or alternative formula) including the default . Using a threshold other than  transforms the formula into a hurdle-weighted option variation. The result is no longer equivalent to the value of a financial option.

Much of the perceived high value of a real option valuation is disproportionately located in the far-right end of the tail of the simulation distribution, an area of low probability but high value outcomes. The option valuation reflects the potential opportunity value if the various outcome assumptions are validated. Targeted, incremental investments can validate these low probability assumptions. If not, replace the assumptions with proven ‘plausible’ elements, then recalculate the value based on new learnings.

The subjective undervaluation of real options partially can be explained by behavioral sciences. An innovation investor may perceive the initial investments to be potentially at a loss, particularly if the POS is low. Kahneman and Tversky’s Prospect theory proclaims that losses are perceived to have an impact more than twice that of gains for the same value. The result is the loss averse investor will subjectively undervalue the opportunity, and therefore the investment, despite the objective and financially accurate real option valuation.

Regret aversion, another behavioral science observation, occurs when an unfounded decision is made to avoid regretting a future outcome. For example, a regret-averse investor decides to invest in a relatively ‘sure bet’ but smaller payoff opportunity relative to an alternative with a significantly higher but presumably uncertain payoff. The regret aversion phenomenon is closely aligned with uncertainty aversion (certainty bias), where the unknown aspects of the innovation opportunity (i.e., newness, lack of control) are rationalized as a hurdle to further investments. The consequences of loss- and regret-averse decision-making are parsimonious investments and underfunding (‘undervaluing’) of promising early-stage innovation opportunities.

A savvy investor can overcome the perceived mis-valuation of an option price. Loss aversion registers significantly high when the entire option value is interpreted as investment risk. This emotional response fails to consider that the initial early-stage investments are only a fraction of the entire option value, necessarily targeted to validate the most salient assumption. Similarly regret aversion should not be misconceived as risk aversion because the exposure of small early-stage investments is usually not material. Instead, these initial investments carefully probe the opportunity’s core value while providing a sense of control over an otherwise uncertain outcome. Regret is minimized by the realization that the opportunity development can be terminated if the assumption outcomes are not promising. The investment funds expended are prudently applied only to investigate a promising opportunity, and, in return, are enhanced by the acquired knowledge and the ability to make a better decision.

Since individuals are prone to cognitive biases, various intervention strategies are designed to reduce them including expert review along with bias and naïve realism awareness.  A phenomenon termed “bias blind spot” succinctly describes an individual’s unconscious susceptibility to biases. This fundamental attribution error remains subconsciously hidden by an illusion of self-introspection, i.e., that we believe, falsely, we have access to our inner intentions or motivations. Biases may be post hoc rationalized away, but nonetheless impact decision-making. To counteract biases, it is insufficient simply be aware of their characteristics, but necessary also to become educated of one’s own introspection illusion.

References 

Real options
Monte Carlo methods in finance
Financial models